Baýram Durdyýew (born 1955 in Aşgabat, USSR) is a Turkmen professional football player and manager.

Career
In 1973, he began his professional career for the Stroitel Aşgabat, in which he played until 1985, when he had finished it.

In 1988, he started his coaching career in Köpetdag, Aşgabat as the head coach's assistant. Since 1990, he led the Köpetdag Aşgabat. In 1992, he also coached the Turkmenistan national football team right until 1996. Later, he coached FC Spartak Semey, Sanat Naft Abadan F.C., FC Ahal and Altyn Asyr FK.

References

External links
 
 

1955 births
Living people
Turkmenistan footballers
Soviet footballers
Association football defenders
FK Köpetdag Aşgabat players
Turkmenistan expatriate football managers
Expatriate football managers in Kazakhstan
Turkmenistan expatriate sportspeople in Kazakhstan
Turkmenistan football managers
Soviet football managers
FK Köpetdag Aşgabat managers
Turkmenistan national football team managers
Sportspeople from Ashgabat
Sanat Naft Abadan F.C. managers